Laos is scheduled to participate at the 2018 Summer Youth Olympics in Buenos Aires, Argentina from 6 October to 18 October 2018.

Athletics

Badminton

Laos was given a quota to compete by the tripartite committee.

 Boys' singles – 1 quota
Singles

Team

Swimming

References

2018 in Laotian sport
Nations at the 2018 Summer Youth Olympics
Laos at the Youth Olympics